In the Red is a three-part BBC Two black comedy-crime drama 1998 series featuring Warren Clarke as BBC Reporter George Cragge and Alun Armstrong as Police Superintendent Frank Jefferson, investigating a series of murders of London bank managers, a small political party contesting a by-election, and a plan to overthrow the Director-General of the BBC.

The series was adapted by Malcolm Bradbury from Mark Tavener's novel of the same name (Hutchinson, 1989), which had been inspired by the writer's early experiences working for the BBC and the Liberal Party.

Following the conclusion of the series, the characters of Charles Prentis, played by Stephen Fry, and Martin McCabe, played by John Bird, who also appeared in the radio adaptation of the book (BBC Two, 1995-1999), were featured in their own spin-off series Absolute Power (BBC Radio 4, 2000-2006/BBC Two, 2003-2005), which was also created and written by Tavener.

References

External links

1998 British television series debuts
1998 British television series endings
1990s British comedy-drama television series
British political satire
1990s British television miniseries
1990s black comedy television series
1990s British crime television series
Political satirical television series
Television shows based on British novels
English-language television shows
Television shows set in London
1990s British satirical television series
1990s British political television series